John Land may refer to:
John Land (field hockey) (1938–2021), British field hockey player
John H. Land (1920–2014), mayor of Apopka, Florida for 61 years
John R. Land (1862–1941), Louisiana Supreme Court judge
John C. Land III, member of the South Carolina Senate
John Henry Land (1918–2011), American judge, lawyer, and politician in Georgia